Samuel Whitbread may refer to:

Samuel Whitbread (1720–1796), English brewer and Member of Parliament
Samuel Whitbread (1764–1815), his son, English politician
Samuel Charles Whitbread, his son, British Member of Parliament for Middlesex, 1820–1830
Samuel Whitbread (1830–1915), his son, British Member of Parliament for Bedford, 1852–1895
Samuel Howard Whitbread, his son, British Member of Parliament for Luton, 1892–1895, and Huntingdon, 1906–1910
Samuel Whitbread (Lord Lieutenant), his grandson, former chairman of Whitbread & Co. and Lord Lieutenant of Bedfordshire.

It may also refer to:
Samuel Whitbread Academy, a secondary school in Shefford, Bedfordshire